Suskowola  is a village in the administrative district of Gmina Pionki, within Radom County, Masovian Voivodeship, in east-central Poland.

The village has a population of 860.

References

Suskowola